Norm Perry or Norman Perry may refer to:

 Norm Perry (Canadian football) (1904–1957), Canadian football player
 Norm Perry (journalist), Canadian broadcast journalist
 Norm Perry (tennis) (born 1938), American tennis player